Mississippi Highway 322 (MS 322) is an east-west state highway connecting Sherard at MS 1 to Crowder at MS 35.

Route description
MS 322 begins in the unincorporated community of Sherard at MS 1. The highway heads due east and enters the city limits of Clarksdale, but travels to the west and south of the downtown area. In the city, it carries the name Sherard Road. Within the city, MS 322 travels mostly past commercial and light industrial businesses. At the southwest corner of Clarksdale, MS 161 ends at an intersection with U.S. Route 61 (US 61) and US 278 however MS 322 continues along US 61 and US 278 along its freeway bypass of Clarksdale. An independent route again, the roadway heads east through agricultural fields and leaves Coahoma County for Quitman County.

The two routes head north and enter the town of Lambert. At Scott Avenue, MS 322 leaves the concurrency and heads east, crossing a railroad and intersecting MS 321. At first, the highway heads due east, but then takes a more curvy path around bayous, Little Tallahatchie River, and Old Yocona River. MS 322 enters the town of Crowder on 3rd Street. Near the center of town, MS 322 takes a one-block jog north on Quitman Avenue before resuming an easterly course on 2nd Street. MS 322 heads into Panola County, still within the town of Crowder, heading in a general eastern direction, again crossing the Little Tallahatchie River, and ends at MS 35.

Except along its concurrencies with U.S. highways around Clarksdale, the entire road is two lanes wide and is fully state-maintained.

Major intersections

References

External links

Highways of the State of Mississippi - Mississippi State Route 322

328
Transportation in Panola County, Mississippi
Transportation in Quitman County, Mississippi
Transportation in Coahoma County, Mississippi